Azimuth Systems was a privately held company located near Boston, Massachusetts. In 2016, the company was acquired by Anritsu. The company's primary products include wireless channel emulators and wireless test equipment for LTE, WiMAX, 2G/3G cellular, and Wi-Fi networks.
 

In 2009 Azimuth Systems wrote a White paper entitled Improving 4G Wireless Broadband Product Design through Effective Channel Emulation Testing.

In April 2010, Azimuth Systems was awarded the Best in Test award from Test & Measurement World Magazine. Also, in 2009, Azimuth Systems was awarded the 4G Wireless Evolution LTE Visionary Awardby TMC.net. In September 2016, Test solutions major Anritsu Corporation acquired Azimuth Systems.

References

External links
Azimuth Systems Website

Wireless networking hardware
Mobile web
Mobile technology
Technology companies established in 2002
2002 establishments in Massachusetts